Shoemake is a surname. Notable people with the surname include:

Charlie Shoemake (born 1937), American jazz vibraphonist
Gayla Leigh Shoemake (born c. 1941), American pageant titleholder
Hub Shoemake (1899–1984), American football player 
Kevin Shoemake (born 1965), British footballer
Shockley Shoemake (1922–2015), American lawyer and politician